The 1948 Tasmanian Australian National Football League (TANFL) premiership season was an Australian Rules football competition staged in Hobart, Tasmania over fifteen (15) roster rounds and four (4) finals series matches between 24 April and 25 September 1948.

Participating Clubs
Clarence District Football Club
New Town District Football Club
Hobart Football Club
New Norfolk District Football Club
North Hobart Football Club
Sandy Bay Football Club

1948 TANFL Club Coaches
E.Edwards (Clarence)
Roy Cazaly (New Town)
Jack Sullivan (Hobart)
Albert "Tich" Edwards (New Norfolk)
Jack Metherell (North Hobart)
Ernie Pilkington (Sandy Bay)

TANFL Reserves Grand Final
New Town 9.11 (65) v Nth Hobart 8.10 (58) – North Hobart Oval

TANFL Under-19's Grand Final
State Schools Old Boys Football Association (SSOBFA)
 Buckingham 10.8 (68) v North West 8.3 (51) – New Town Oval.
Note: Buckingham were affiliated to New Town, North West were affiliated to North Hobart.

State Grand Final
(Saturday, 2 October 1948)
New Town: 16.9 (105)
Nth Launceston: 16.7 (103)
Attendance: 8,387 at North Hobart Oval

Intrastate Matches
Jubilee Shield (Saturday, 15 May 1948)
NWFU 13.16 (94) v TANFL 10.17 (77) – Att: 2,300 at West Park Oval

Jubilee Shield (Saturday, 5 June 1948)
 NTFA 16.19 (115) v TANFL 15.17 (107) – Att: 9,636 at North Hobart Oval

Jubilee Shield (Saturday, 19 June 1948)
TANFL 15.16 (106) v NTFA 14.12 (96) – Att: 6,602 at North Hobart Oval

Jubilee Shield (Saturday, 10 July 1948)
 NTFA 18.18 (126) v TANFL 16.13 (109) – Att: 10,000 at York Park

Interstate Match
Exhibition Match (Saturday, 31 July 1948)
East Perth 14.17 (101) v TANFL 12.20 (92) – Att: 4,385 at North Hobart Oval

Leading Goalkickers: TANFL
Ian Westell (Sandy Bay) – 57
W.Pepper (Hobart) – 49
J.Martin (Sandy Bay) – 45
D.Challender (North Hobart) – 44
G.Barwick (New Norfolk) – 35

Medal Winners
Joe Brown (New Norfolk) – William Leitch Medal
Not Awarded – George Watt Medal (Reserves)
Rex Garwood (Buckingham) – V.A Geard Medal (Under-19's)

1948 TANFL Ladder

Round 1
(Saturday, 24 April 1948)
Sandy Bay 12.13 (85) v Nth Hobart 11.15 (81) – Att: 4,151 at North Hobart Oval
Hobart 12.6 (78) v New Norfolk 6.13 (49) – Att: 2,271 at TCA Ground
New Town 13.20 (98) v Clarence 7.20 (62) – Att: 1,252 at Bellerive Oval

Round 2
(Saturday, 1 May 1948)
Sandy Bay 11.17 (83) v Clarence 9.16 (70) – Att: 1,896 at North Hobart Oval
Nth Hobart 10.13 (73) v Hobart 8.16 (64) – Att: 4,536 at TCA Ground
New Norfolk 9.18 (72) v New Town 8.13 (61) – Att: 1,750 at Boyer Oval

Round 3
(Saturday, 8 May 1948)
Hobart 13.15 (93) v New Town 12.15 (87) – Att: 3,397 at North Hobart Oval
Sandy Bay 13.20 (98) v New Norfolk 9.9 (63) – Att: 2,134 at Queenborough Oval
Nth Hobart 16.20 (116) v Clarence 3.11 (29) – Att: 1,025 at Bellerive Oval

Round 4
(Saturday, 22 May 1948)
New Norfolk 12.9 (81) v Nth Hobart 11.12 (78) – Att: 2,538 at North Hobart Oval
New Town 11.16 (82) v Sandy Bay 11.15 (81) – Att: 3,592 at New Town Oval
Hobart 19.20 (134) v Clarence 5.5 (35) – Att: 1,134 at Bellerive Oval

Round 5
(Saturday, 29 May 1948)
New Town 6.25 (61) v Nth Hobart 5.9 (39) – Att: 3,361 at North Hobart Oval
Sandy Bay 10.9 (69) v Hobart 8.17 (65) – Att: 2,339 at Queenborough Oval
New Norfolk 12.19 (91) v Clarence 2.8 (20) – Att: 1,029 at Boyer Oval

Round 6
(Saturday, 12 June 1948)
New Town 22.24 (156) v Clarence 8.12 (60) – Att: 1,783 at North Hobart Oval
Sandy Bay 12.13 (85) v Nth Hobart 11.7 (73) – Att: 3,286 at Queenborough Oval
Hobart 10.5 (65) v New Norfolk 3.3 (21) – Att: 1,843 at Boyer Oval

Round 7
(Monday, 14 June 1948)
Hobart 10.6 (66) v Nth Hobart 5.13 (43) – Att: 3,999 at North Hobart Oval
New Town 16.17 (113) v New Norfolk 13.5 (83) – Att: 2,498 at New Town Oval
Sandy Bay 21.20 (146) v Clarence 9.10 (64) – Att: 1,035 at Bellerive Oval

Round 8
(Saturday, 26 June 1948)
Nth Hobart 8.18 (66) v Clarence 3.12 (30) – Att: 901 at North Hobart Oval
New Town 8.12 (60) v Hobart 7.7 (49) – Att: 3,636 at TCA Ground
Sandy Bay 9.7 (61) v New Norfolk 6.10 (46) – Att: 1,084 at Boyer Oval

Round 9
(Saturday, 3 July 1948)
New Town 10.8 (68) v Sandy Bay 10.8 (68) – Att: 5,433 at North Hobart Oval
Hobart 16.25 (121) v Clarence 4.13 (37) – Att: 548 at TCA Ground
Nth Hobart 13.7 (85) v New Norfolk 10.14 (74) – Att: 1,065 at Boyer Oval

Round 10
(Saturday, 17 July 1948)
Hobart 10.18 (78) v Sandy Bay 9.15 (69) – Att: 3,075 at North Hobart Oval
New Town 16.15 (111) v Nth Hobart 12.11 (83) – Att: 2,107 at New Town Oval
New Norfolk 9.11 (65) v Clarence 6.8 (44) – Att: 1,012 at Bellerive Oval

Round 11
(Saturday, 24 July 1948)
Nth Hobart 19.9 (123) v Sandy Bay 13.15 (93) – Att: 3,975 at North Hobart Oval
New Town 19.25 (139) v Clarence 8.7 (55) – Att: 1,126 at New Town Oval
Hobart 9.13 (67) v New Norfolk 8.11 (59) – Att: 1,378 at Boyer Oval

Round 12
(Saturday, 7 August 1948)
New Town 16.17 (113) v New Norfolk 7.11 (53) – Att: 2,114 at North Hobart Oval
Nth Hobart 13.13 (91) v Hobart 12.12 (84) – Att: 3,049 at TCA Ground
Sandy Bay 13.11 (89) v Clarence 6.10 (46) – Att: 1,019 at Queenborough Oval

Round 13
(Saturday, 14 August 1948)
Sandy Bay 7.12 (54) v New Norfolk 5.4 (34) – Att: 1,627 at North Hobart Oval
Hobart 6.15 (51) v New Town 3.10 (28) – Att: 3,448 at New Town Oval
Clarence 7.22 (64) v Nth Hobart 5.19 (49) – Att: 500 at Bellerive Oval

Round 14
(Saturday, 21 August 1948)
Nth Hobart 12.18 (90) v New Norfolk 8.8 (56) –  Att: 1,658 at North Hobart Oval
Sandy Bay 11.14 (80) v New Town 8.12 (60) – Att: 4,222 at Queenborough Oval
Hobart 7.16 (58) v Clarence 4.15 (39) – Att: 836 at Bellerive Oval

Round 15
(Saturday, 28 August 1948)
New Town 17.11 (113) v Nth Hobart 11.15 (81) – Att: 2,940 at North Hobart Oval
Sandy Bay 11.18 (84) v Hobart 11.11 (77) – Att: 4,028 at TCA Ground
New Norfolk 19.17 (131) v Clarence 6.18 (54) – Att: 885 at Boyer Oval

First Semi Final
(Saturday, 4 September 1948)
Nth Hobart: 5.0 (30) | 6.3 (39) | 9.8 (62) | 13.10 (88)
Hobart: 5.3 (33) | 8.6 (54) | 10.6 (66) | 12.7 (79)
Attendance: 6,792 at North Hobart Oval

Second Semi Final
(Saturday, 11 September 1948)
New Town: 4.2 (26) | 6.6 (42) | 10.10 (70) | 11.13 (79)
Sandy Bay: 0.5 (5) | 3.8 (26) | 7.11 (53) | 8.15 (63)
Attendance: 8,918 at North Hobart Oval

Preliminary Final
(Saturday, 18 September 1948)
Nth Hobart: 4.3 (27) | 8.5 (53) | 13.7 (85) | 15.8 (98)
Sandy Bay: 2.5 (17) | 3.9 (27) | 7.11 (53) | 11.16 (82)
Attendance: 9,129 at North Hobart Oval

Grand Final
(Saturday, 25 September 1948)
New Town: 1.3 (9) | 3.10 (28) | 6.14 (50) | 11.15 (81)
Nth Hobart: 1.4 (10) | 2.8 (20) | 5.9 (39) | 9.11 (65)
Attendance: 12,236 at North Hobart Oval

Source: All scores and statistics courtesy of the Hobart Mercury publications.

Tasmanian Football League seasons